is the seventh single from Aya Matsuura, who was a Hello! Project solo artist at the time. It was released on September 19, 2002 under the Zetima label.

Track listing 
  – 4:06
 "I Know" – 4:41
 "The Bigaku (Instrumental)" – 4:05

External links 
 The Bigaku entry on the Hello! Project official website 

Aya Matsuura songs
Zetima Records singles
2002 singles
Songs written by Tsunku
Song recordings produced by Tsunku
2002 songs